Anna Åström (born 5 November 1990) is a Swedish actress born in Gråbo, near Lerum.

Career
Anna Åström has been seen in leading roles in features such as Home is Here and Us (Vi) and had supporting roles in a variety of other films, both Swedish and international. She appeared in a number short films and in Swedish TV series, including Black Lake (Svartjön). She has also taken part in many theatre productions at the Stockholm's National Theatre and The Royal dramatic theater.

Filmography
2019 Midsommar
2019 How You Look at Me
2018 Excuse Me, I'm Looking for the Ping-pong Room and My Girlfriend (Short)
2016 Svartsjön (TV Series) 
2016 Home Is Here 
2016 Dans la forêt 
2015 Utopic Dystopia (Short)
2015 Code 100 (TV Series) 
2015 Kerstin Ström (Short) 
2014/II Sleeper Cell (Short) 
2014 Viva Hate (TV Mini-Series) 
2014 - 2013 Vikings (2013 TV series)
2013 The Expedition (Short) 
2013 Vi
2012 Göra slut (Short) 
2012 Prime-time (Video) 
2012 Kontoret (TV Series) 
2012 True people (TV Series) 
2012 Shoo bre 
2012 Arne Dahl: Ont blod (TV Mini-Series) 
2011 Welcome to Caligola (Short) 
2011 Irene Huss (TV Series) 
2011 Drottningoffret (TV Mini-Series) 
2010 Kommissarie Winter (TV Series) 
2002 Dieselråttor och sjömansmöss (TV Series)

References

External links

1990 births
Living people
People from Lerum Municipality
Swedish film actresses